Sunzhunsky District is the name of several administrative and municipal districts in Russia:
Sunzhensky District, Chechen Republic, an administrative and municipal district of the Chechen Republic
Sunzhensky District, Republic of Ingushetia, an administrative and municipal district of the Republic of Ingushetia
Sunzhensky otdel, a former district of the Russian Empire

See also
Sunzhensky (disambiguation)

References